Jim Daly may refer to:

Jim Daly (politician) (born 1972), Irish Fine Gael politician
Jim Daly (evangelist) (born 1961), American social conservative leader
Jim Daly (actor) (born 1934/35), Australian actor

See also
James Daly (disambiguation)
Jim Daley, coach
Jimmy Daly (1904–?), Irish footballer